Panola College is a public community college in Carthage, Texas, the county seat of Panola County. As defined by the Texas Legislature, the official service area of Panola College includes:
all of Marion, Panola, and Shelby Counties, and
all of Harrison County excluding the territory within the Hallsville Independent School District.

History
Panola College was established June 14, 1947, and began operations on January 19, 1948 at the corner of State Highway 315 and U.S. Highway 79, where it continues to operate today.  The first permanent buildings were erected in 1949.

In 1995, the adjacent counties of Harrison (excluding parts as noted above), Marion, and Shelby were added by law to Panola's designated service area.  Panola operates branch locations in Marshall and Center.

The college also serves residents of nearby Louisiana parishes (as Panola County is on the state border) and United States Air Force members stationed at Barksdale Air Force Base.

The first president of Panola County Junior College was B. W. Musgraves (1948–50). He was succeeded by Floyd Boze (1950–51), M. P. Baker (1951–67), former Carthage school superintendent Q. M. Martin (1967–73), Dr. Charles Hays (1973–74), longtime PJC basketball coach Arthur M. Johnson (1974–81), Dr. Gary McDaniel (1981–92), Charles Hughes (1992–93), Dr. William Edmonson (1993–2000), and Dr. Gregory Powell, (2000–Present).

In the spring of 1948 fifty-five charter students enrolled in the initial courses. In the fall of 2012 Panola College enrollment reached 2,584 students.

Athletics
Panola College plays the following sports.
Volleyball
Basketball, Men's
Basketball, Women's
Baseball
Rodeo
The teams are known as the Ponies, with the women's teams called the Fillies. Panola has won three NJCAA National Championships, a baseball championship in 1969 and a pair of women's basketball crowns in 1977 and 1978. Panola plays in the Region XIV Athletic Conference, a part of the NJCAA.

Notable alumni
Chad Dallas, professional baseball player
Fabulous Flournoy, current assistant coach with the Toronto Raptors, former player and the head coach for basketball team Newcastle Eagles, who compete in the British Basketball League.
Dexter Shouse, former professional basketball player, played for Panola during the 1981–82 & 1982–83 seasons

Gallery

References

External links
 Official website

Universities and colleges accredited by the Southern Association of Colleges and Schools
Community colleges in Texas
Educational institutions established in 1947
Education in Panola County, Texas
Buildings and structures in Panola County, Texas
1947 establishments in Texas
NJCAA athletics